The 2020 Welsh Open (also known as the ManBetX Welsh Open due to sponsorship) was a professional snooker tournament which took place from 10 to 16 February 2020 at the Motorpoint Arena in Cardiff, Wales. It was the 12th ranking event of the 2019–20 snooker season, and the final tournament of the season's Home Nations Series. It was the 29th edition of the Welsh Open, first held in 1992. The event featured a prize fund of £405,000 with the winner receiving £70,000.

Neil Robertson was the defending champion, having beaten Stuart Bingham 9–7 in the 2019 final, but he lost in the quarter-finals to Kyren Wilson. Shaun Murphy won the event, with a 9–1 win over Kyren Wilson in the final. There were a total of 77 century breaks at the event, the highest made by Wilson, a maximum break of 147 in the first frame of his first-round match with Jackson Page.

Format
The Welsh Open began as a ranking tournament in 1992.
The 2020 tournament took place at the Motorpoint Arena in Cardiff, Wales between 10 and 16 February, the 29th edition of the event. It was the twelfth World Snooker Tour ranking competition in the 2019–20 snooker season, following the World Grand Prix and preceding the Snooker Shoot Out. It was the fourth and final event of the Home Nations Series, and featured 128 participants from the World Snooker Tour.

The defending Welsh Open champion from 2019 was Neil Robertson who won the final with a 9–7 victory over Stuart Bingham. All matches were best-of-seven  until the quarter-finals, which were the best-of-nine, the semi-finals the best-of-eleven. The final was played over two , as the best-of-17 frames. The event was sponsored by sports betting company BetVictor, and broadcast locally by BBC Cymru Wales; Quest; Eurosport in Europe and Australia; CCTV, Superstars Online, Youku and Zhibo.tv in China; True sport in Thailand; Sky Sports in New Zealand and DAZN in Canada. A single qualifying match was played between two local amateur players – Darren Morgan and Gavin Lewis.

Prize fund
The event's total prize fund is £405,000, with the winner receiving £70,000. The breakdown of prize money for this year is shown below:

 Winner: £70,000
 Runner-up: £30,000
 Semi-final: £20,000
 Quarter-final: £10,000
 Last 16: £7,500
 Last 32: £4,000
 Last 64: £3,000
 Highest break: £5,000
 Total: £405,000

Summary

The opening round was played on 10 and 11 February. Local amateur Darren Morgan completed a 4–0 win over fellow Welsh amateur Gavin Lewis, but lost to Shaun Murphy 0–4 in the opening round. Soheil Vahedi defeated 20th seed Thepchaiya Un-Nooh 4–2, whilst 12th seed David Gilbert was beaten by Matthew Stevens 2–4. Kyren Wilson defeated Jackson Page 4–3, and made a maximum break in the opening frame, the second of his career.

The next three rounds were played on 12 and 13 February. After defeating Jamie Clarke in the first round, defending champion Neil Robertson defeated Mark Joyce, Noppon Saengkham and completed a whitewash over Gerard Greene to reach the quarter-finals. Wilson defeated Liam Highfield, Martin O'Donnell and ninth seed Ding Junhui to play Robertson, which he won 5–0. Mark Selby defeated David Grace, Chen Zifan, Andy Lee and Zhao Xintong to play Ronnie O'Sullivan in the quarter-finals, with O'Sullivan winning 5–1.

Seeded 19, Yan Bingtao defeated Michael Holt, Mitchell Mann, Stuart Bingham and Anthony McGill to reach the quarter-finals, who had defeated Luca Brecel 4–3 in the last 16. Yan defeated Higgins 5–2, where Higgins described his performance as "pathetic". Murphy defeated Alfie Burden in the second round 4–3, before beating Ben Woollaston and Dominic Dale 4–1. He met Judd Trump, the world number one, who had defeated James Cahill, Billy Joe Castle, Igor Figueiredo and Stephen Maguire in the quarter-final and won 5–3. Wilson defeated O'Sullivan in the first semi-final on a deciding frame 6–5, whilst Murphy overcame Yan by the same scoreline.

The final was played between eighth seed Kyren Wilson and tenth seed Shaun Murphy on 16 February. The final was played over two  as a best-of-17 frames match. Murphy won the opening frame with a break of 108, and made a second century break, a 134, in frame eight as he won seven of the opening session frames to lead 7–1. Wilson won only frame seven during the opening session. This was Murphy's second championship victory of the season, having also won the 2019 China Championship 9–8 over Mark Williams.

Tournament draw
The results from the event is shown below. Players in bold denote match winners, whilst numbers in brackets are player's seedings.

Qualifying round

 4–0

Main draw

Section 1

Section 2

Section 3

Section 4

Section 5

Section 6

Section 7

Section 8

Finals

Final

Century breaks
The event had a total of 77 century breaks made during the event, the highest being a maximum break of 147 by Kyren Wilson in the second frame of his first round match.

 147, 136, 100  Kyren Wilson
 142, 131, 125, 118, 100  Ronnie O'Sullivan
 142, 100  Zhao Xintong
 141  Lyu Haotian
 140  Igor Figueiredo
 140  Si Jiahui
 139, 114, 111  Matthew Stevens
 138, 117  Mark Selby
 136, 128  Stephen Maguire
 135, 133, 121, 116  Neil Robertson
 135  Luo Honghao
 135  Mitchell Mann
 134, 116, 109, 108, 102, 101, 100  Shaun Murphy
 133  Robert Milkins
 132, 126, 121, 121, 101, 100, 100  Judd Trump
 132  Ryan Day
 130  Liam Highfield
 129  David Grace
 128, 117  Luca Brecel
 127, 122  Barry Hawkins
 127  Ricky Walden
 126, 106  Chen Feilong
 125, 108, 100  Yan Bingtao
 123  Dominic Dale
 120, 114  Anthony McGill
 117  Robbie Williams
 116, 110  Ding Junhui
 116, 107, 104, 100  John Higgins
 116  Liang Wenbo
 114, 101  Mark Allen
 110, 100  Stuart Bingham
 109  Jimmy Robertson
 108  Jack Lisowski
 108  Tian Pengfei
 105  Stuart Carrington
 104  Andy Lee
 101  Xiao Guodong
 100  Gerard Greene
 100  Elliot Slessor

References

Home Nations Series
2020
2020 in snooker
2020 in Welsh sport
February 2020 sports events in the United Kingdom
Sports competitions in Cardiff